Idiot's Delight may refer to:

Art and entertainment 
 Idiot's Delight (play), a 1936 play by Robert E. Sherwood
 Idiot's Delight (film), a 1939 adaptation of the play, starring Clark Gable and Norma Shearer
 Idiot's Delight, a freeform radio program hosted by Vin Scelsa

Patience or Card Solitaire 
 Idiot's Delight, a pejorative term for any patience or card solitaire
 Idiot's Delight is also an alternative name for the following patiences or card solitaires: 
 Aces Up, a game which is playable in a minimal space
 King Albert (solitaire), believed to be named after King Albert of Belgium
 Perpetual Motion (solitaire), which has the object of discarding playing cards from the tableau

See also 
 Idiots Deluxe, a 1945 short film starring the Three Stooges
 Delight (disambiguation)